is a 2016 Japanese action comedy film directed by Takashi Miike from a screenplay by Kankuro Kudo based on the popular manga series Mogura no Uta by Noboru Takahashi. It is the sequel to the 2013 film The Mole Song: Undercover Agent Reiji and follows the story of Reiji Kikukawa after the events of that film.

Plot
Undercover investigator Reiji Kikukawa, nicknamed "The Mole", has infiltrated the Hiura gang led by Masaya Hiura, a.k.a. "Crazy Papillon", and risen to the rank of second-in-command after eliminating the members of the clan who were involved in the illegal drug trade without authorization. A disgraced yakuza member forges an alliance with the Dragon Skulls, a Chinese gang, to take on the Sukiya-kai clan that is in control of the Kanto Region. Shuho Todoroki, head of the Sukiya-kai, becomes a target and his daughter Karen is kidnapped to be sold at a beauty auction in Hong Kong. Reiji once again tries to do the right thing while remaining undercover as he becomes entangled in a massive international conspiracy. Meanwhile, elite police officer Shinya Kabuto moves to arrest Reiji.

Cast
Toma Ikuta as Reiji Kikukawa
Eita as Shinya Kabuto
Tsubasa Honda as Karen Todoroki
Shinichi Tsutsumi as Masaya Hiura 
Riisa Naka as Junna Wakagi
Yusuke Kamiji as Kenta Kurokawa
Nanao as Hufon
Arata Furuta as Momoji Sakuraja
Kanichi Endo as Kazumi Akagiri
Sarutoki Minagawa as Doppo Fukuzumi
Mitsuru Fukikoshi as Toshio Sakami
Koichi Iwaki as Shuho Todoroki
Ikumi Hisamatsu as Chirin

Release
The film premiered at the 2016 International Film Festival & Awards Macao at 8:00 p.m. on Friday, December 9, 2016. It later received wide release in Japan on December 23, 2016. It had its North American premiere at the 16th New York Asian Film Festival at 6:00 p.m. on Friday, July 14, 2017. By the first screenings, the film had ranked #5 at the Japanese Box Office, and earned ¥223 million (US$1.804 million).

Reception
The film received generally positive reviews. Mark Schilling of The Japan Times wrote that Toma Ikuta is "a versatile actor" who plays "a goofy undercover-cop-cum-gangster". In a separate review of the film he wrote that The Mole Song: Hong Kong Capriccio is one of Takashi Miike's better films, noting that "Ikuta gives himself up totally to the idiocy of being Reiji, from his incurable awkwardness with women to his knack for stupidly getting himself into perilous situations." Maggie Lee of Variety wrote, "Despite the ragtag characters, sudden twists, and dizzying collage-like animated sequences, Kudo's literate screenplay and Kenji Yamashita's brisk editing manage to steer the main plot on course, making this one of the easiest-to-follow outings by Miike."

Home video
The film was released on Blu-ray & DVD on June 14, 2017.

References

External links

Official website

2016 films
Films directed by Takashi Miike
Films with screenplays by Kankurō Kudō
Live-action films based on manga
Yakuza films
Triad films
Films about police officers
Films set in Hong Kong
2010s Japanese-language films
Films about amputees
Films about human trafficking
Japanese action comedy films
2010s police comedy films
2016 action comedy films
2010s Japanese films
2010s Hong Kong films